Tömör-Ochiryn Tulga (born 11 February 1998) is a Mongolian wrestler. He competed in the men's freestyle 65 kg event at the 2020 Summer Olympics.

References

External links
 

1998 births
Living people
Mongolian male sport wrestlers
Olympic wrestlers of Mongolia
Wrestlers at the 2020 Summer Olympics
Place of birth missing (living people)
World Wrestling Championships medalists
21st-century Mongolian people

https://uww.org/article/watch-tumur-ochirs-underhook-supremacy

https://www.24tsag.mn/a/198004

https://tovch.mn/n/1842

https://sport.gov.mn/national-team/i/32573/

https://www.sonin.mn/news/sport/134780

https://isee.mn/n/46262